Wilbert Franklin Rickard (7 January 1884 – 19 January 1975) was a Liberal party member of the House of Commons of Canada. He was born in Clarke Township, Ontario and became a farmer by career.

Rickard attended public and secondary schools at Newcastle. He served as a regional reeve for Clarke Township, Ontario and in 1933 was warden for Northumberland and Dufferin.

He was first elected to Parliament at the Durham riding in the 1935 general election and re-elected there in 1940. Rickard was defeated by Charles Elwood Stephenson of the Progressive Conservative party in the 1945 election.

Electoral record

References

External links
 

1884 births
Canadian farmers
Liberal Party of Canada MPs
Members of the House of Commons of Canada from Ontario
Mayors of places in Ontario
People from Clarington
1975 deaths